Roger Rio (13 February 1913 in Dunkerque – 23 April 1999) was a French association footballer. He played for FC Rouen, and earned 18 caps and scored 4 goals for the France national football team, and played in the 1934 FIFA World Cup. He was the father of Patrice Rio, who represented France at the 1978 FIFA World Cup.

References

1913 births
1999 deaths
French footballers
France international footballers
Ligue 1 players
Ligue 2 players
FC Rouen players
1934 FIFA World Cup players
Association football midfielders